HD 111456 is a yellow-white hued star in the northern circumpolar constellation of Ursa Major. It is dimly visible to the naked eye, having an apparent visual magnitude of 5.85. HD 111456 is a nucleus cluster member of the Ursa Major Moving Group, a set of stars that are moving through space with a similar heading and velocity. Six other stars in the nucleus of the group are prominent members of the Big Dipper asterism.

The stellar classification for this star is F7 V, indicating that it is an ordinary F-type main-sequence star. It is young, around 300−400 million years of age, and is spinning with a relatively high projected rotational velocity of 41.5 km/s. This is one of the most active F-type stars known, and it is a strong emitter of X-rays and an extreme UV source. It is an astrometric binary with a period of four years and a mass ratio of 0.5. Hence, the companion may be a young white dwarf star.

References

F-type main-sequence stars
Astrometric binaries
Ursa Major Moving Group

Ursa Major (constellation)
Durchmusterung objects
111456
062512
4867